Kapalaran is a Filipino daytime television drama aired in the Cebuano language. It was aired by ABS-CBN Regional Network Group which ran from September 2, 2002 to January 2, 2004 for a total of three seasons. It was re-aired on ABS-CBN Sports and Action, both ABS-CBN and TFC.

The series originally aired on September 2, 2002 every Monday to Friday at 4:30 to 5:00 pm before TV Patrol Regional on ABS-CBN Regional Network Group as a block timer by Alba Productions, but it got picked up to run of the first season on September 2, 2002 to April 16, 2003. And the second season picked up from April 21 to August 29, 2003. The third season picked up from September 1, 2003 to January 2, 2004.

Synopsis
Kapalaran is based on a fictional story about two families who are against each other but are contradicted by the love of their children. The show opens with the husband of  Stella Mendoza (Liza Val) getting shot.  But who shot him?  Stella then blames the husband of Christina Castillo (Disi Alba) because of their past differences.  As they go into the court hearings, Stella's daughter Theresa (Chelsea de la Serna) falls in love with the son of Christina Castillo, Raul (Giovanni de Vera). The murder case takes a turn when the evidences points to Stella murdering her own husband.  As her verdict is announced, she goes crazy, takes a gun out of the holster of a court police officer, and shoots the detective who found the evidence Cesar Arman (Joel Torre).

The good natured Christina Castillo (Disi Alba), who is a doctor, takes over Cesar's operation and saves his life. Thankful for all of Christina's help, Cesar develops feelings for Christina, and this begins a romance between them. An American, Brandon Smith (Philip Anthony) visits the Philippines only to find out that his girlfriend Theresa Mendoza is now in love with Raul Castillo.  Brandon decides to leave Theresa and goes back to the U.S.  However, he gets kidnapped for ransom on his way back to the U.S. by the leader of the rebels, played by Rommel Montano.

While Brandon is in the rebel camp, he plans on escaping with the fellow prisoners.  He is successful, but gets lost in a remote island where he meets a native couple, immediately learning the way of a third world country. Back in the city, Christina's husband leaves her and dies in a plane crash. His body is not found, but Christina pursues in a search for the body.  Considerably, a thunderstorm wrecks her boat in the ocean.

Meanwhile, Stella Mendoza escapes from prison and tries to get revenge. While being chased by the cops, she jumps into a cliff and loses her memory after hitting her head.

Brandon, Stella and Christina try to find their way back into their normal lives against the villains Fred (Gino Antonio), Vicky (Carol Go), Magda (Chanda Romero) and Cult Leader (Luke Mejares).

Cast

Main cast
 Disi Alba as Christina Castillo
 Joel Torre as Cesar Arman
 Philip Anthony as Brandon Smith

Supporting cast
 Lisa Val as Stella Mendoza
 Rae Sillana as Jenny
 Luke Mejares as the Cult leader
 Rommel Montano as the Rebel leader
 Giovanni de Vera as Raul Castillo
 Bernard Cardona as Darwin
 Angeline Aguilar as Charlene
 Chanda Romero as Magda
 Pilar Pilapil
 Cesar Montano as himself
 Sunshine Cruz as herself
 Karlo Lim as Louis
 Edelyn Okano as Diane
 Randolph Libres as Danilo
 Carol Go as Vicky
 Gino Antonio as Fred Alonso
 Meriam Sanchez

Extended Cast
 Lito Legaspi as Don Pedro
 Rochelle Barrameda as Isabel
 Dianne dela Fuente as Maureen
 Joji Isla as Juanito
 Miko Samson as Jeffrey
 Glaiza de Castro as Rosalie
 Alwyn Uytingco as Rene
 Rodney Shattara as Joshua
 Emman Abeleda as Henry
 Bayani Casimiro Jr. as Andy
 Nanding Josef as Mateo

Production staff
Executive Producer: Ron Valdueza
Producer: Alba Productions
Written by: Disi Alba, R. D. Alba, Helen Macarayan
Directed by: R. D. Alba

References
1.Bohol Chronicle Article

External links
 Kapalaran

ABS-CBN Regional shows
2002 Philippine television series debuts
2004 Philippine television series endings
ABS-CBN drama series